Yimin Power Station or  Huaneng Yimin Power Station is a large coal-fired power station in China. The power plant is located in Inner Mongolia, China and has 3,400 MW of capacity.

See also 

 List of coal power stations
 List of power stations in China

External links 

 Huaneng Yimin Power Station on Global Energy Monitor

References 

Coal-fired power stations in China